This page summarises the figures from the WHO Influenza A Situation Updates issued roughly once every other day, and since 6 July from ECDC.  For each country or territory, the table lists the number of confirmed cases of swine flu on the first reported day each month, and the latest figure. The number of countries affected is shown, and the number of days it has taken for the number of cases to double.  The table can be sorted by country, date of first confirmed case or date of first confirmed case by continent.

As no global reports have been issued by WHO since 6 July 2009, data since then is taken from the reports of ECDC.  ECDC stopped reporting cases outside Europe in August, and only reported deaths from 30 September.

Tables by month
The full figures for each month can be found in the following tables:
 2009 flu pandemic table April 2009
 2009 flu pandemic table May 2009
 2009 flu pandemic table June 2009
 2009 flu pandemic table July 2009
 2009 flu pandemic table August 2009
 2009 flu pandemic table September 2009
 2009 flu pandemic table October 2009
 2009 flu pandemic table November 2009
 2009 flu pandemic table December 2009

Confirmed cases

Deaths

References

tables